Jorge Miguel Correia Coelho (born October 18, 1978, Lisbon) is a Portuguese basketball player. He played at his home country for Portugal Telecom (1999/2000-2002-2003), CF Belenenses (2003/2004-2005/2006) and FC Porto (2006/2007). Coelho was also a member of the Portuguese squad present at EuroBasket 2007 finals.

External links
 LCB Profile
 EuroBasket 2007 Profile

1978 births
Living people
Portuguese men's basketball players
FC Porto basketball players
Gijón Baloncesto players
Power forwards (basketball)
Centers (basketball)
Sportspeople from Lisbon
Palencia Baloncesto players